A nanoprobe is an optical device developed by tapering an optical fiber to a tip measuring 100 nm = 1000 angstroms wide. Also, a very thin coating of silver nanoparticles helps to enhance the Raman scattering effect of the light. (The phenomenon of light reflection from an object when illuminated by a laser light is referred to as Raman scattering.) The reflected light demonstrates vibration energies unique to each object (samples in this case), which can be characterised and identified. The silver nanoparticles in this technique provides for the rapid oscillations of electrons, adding to vibration energies, and thus enhancing Raman Scattering—commonly known as surface-enhanced Raman scattering (SERS). These SERS nanoprobes produce higher electromagnetic fields enabling higher signal output—eventually resulting in accurate detection and analysis of samples.

The term nanoprobe also refers more generically to any chemical or biological technique that deals with nanoquantitles, that is, introducing or extracting substances measured in nanoliters or nanograms rather than microliters or micrograms. For example:
 Introducing nanoparticles in aqueous solution to serve as nanoprobes in electrospray ionization mass spectrometry
 Extracting nanoquantities of neurochemicals via in vivo microdialysis
 Using gold-based metallic nanoprobes for Theranostics (therapeutic diagnostics)

In semiconductor manufacturing, nanoprobing is showing potential for conventional IC failure analysis and debugging, as well as for transistor design, circuit, and process development, and even for yield engineering.

See also 
 Breakthrough Starshot

References

External links
frost.com

Nanotechnology